Menken is a surname. Notable people with the surname include:

Adah Isaacs Menken (1835–1868), American actress, painter and poet
Alan Menken (born 1949), American musical theatre and film composer and pianist
Carol Menken-Schaudt (born 1957), former American basketball player and 1984 Olympic gold medallist
Helen Menken (1901–1966), American actress
Marie Menken (1909–1970), American experimental filmmaker and socialite
Shepard Menken (1921–1999), American voice actor and character actor
Solomon Stanwood Menken (1870–1954), attorney in the United States, founder of the National Security League

See also 
 Mencken (surname)